Shaiful Islam (born 2 January 1983) is a Bangladeshi cricketer. He made his List A debut for Khelaghar Samaj Kallyan Samity in the 2016–17 Dhaka Premier Division Cricket League on 8 June 2017.

References

External links
 

1983 births
Living people
Bangladeshi cricketers
Khelaghar Samaj Kallyan Samity cricketers
Place of birth missing (living people)